Vitesse was a Dutch rock group founded by drummer and singer Herman van Boeyen, assisted by an assortment of other musicians including Herman Brood. The band was active from 1975 to 1994 and had a number of hit singles in the early 1980s. It built a reputation as a good live act.

History
Vitesse was founded in 1975 in Amsterdam by Herman van Boeyen, with Herman Brood (vocals and piano), Rob ten Bokum (guitar), and Peter Smid (bass). They signed with Reprise that same year and released an untitled debut album. At that time the band consisted of Van Boeyen, Brood, Jan-Piet den Tex, Gerrit Veen, and Ross Recardi; Brood left the band shortly thereafter and took Veen with him.

A second album, Rendez Vous (Negram, 1977), was commercially unsuccessful, as was the third, Out in the Country (Negram, 1978), though it received positive reviews. Rock Invader (Negram, 1979) was more successful, with two charting singles: "Rock & Roll Band" and "Whole lot of Travellin'". The band was more successful in Germany. (These three Negram albums were re-released by EMI in 2007.)

After Herman Brood's Wild Romance dissolved, Van Boeyen tried again to collaborate with Brood, but this was not a success; this time Brood took bass player Peter van Straten with him when he left, though Van Straten returned a few days later. in 1980 the band released the album Live as a trio: Van Boeyen, Van Straten, and Jan van der Meij. The latter two left soon and founded Powerplay.

Vitesse finally began scoring hits in 1982, with a line-up that included Otto Cooymans, Ruud Englebert, and Carl Carlton. The singles "Rosalyn" and "Good lookin'" received significant attention, and the albums Live in Germany and Incomplete Works & Other Hits reached #19 and #15 on the album charts. The single "Julia" was #30 in 1983, but after a dispute with Van Boeyen Cooymans left the band, and took Englebert and Carlton with him. The next album, Vanity Island, and the single of the same name were flops and after another failed album the band lost its record contract (with Philips).

In subsequent years Van Boeyen kept trying, but without avail. He had moved to Germany, playing mostly with German musicians. The 1990 single "Ever since I met you" was a moderate success in Germany, but not in the Netherlands. In 1994, after the single "All of the time" was a flop, Van Boeyen dissolved the band.

Discography

Albums 

|-
|align="left"|Vitesse||1975||-||||||
|-
|align="left"|Rendez-vous||1977||-||||||
|-
|align="left"|Herman Brood in Vitesse||1978||-|||||| Reissue of the first album
|-
|align="left"|Out in the country||1978||-||||||
|-
|align="left"|Rock invader||1979||10-11-1979||29||6||
|-
|align="left"|Live||1980||-|||||| Live album
|-
|align="left"|Good news||1981||-||||||
|-
|align="left"|Live in Germany||1982||11-09-1982||19||14|| Live album
|-
|align="left"|Incomplete Works and Other Hits (You Always Never Knew You Would Like to Know Already About With)||1982||18-12-1982||15||10|| Anthology
|-
|align="left"|Vanity islands||1984||-||||||
|-
|align="left"|Het beste van||1985||-|||||| Anthology
|-
|align="left"|Keepin' me alive||1985||-||||||
|-
|align="left"|The best||1988||-|||||| Anthology
|-
|align="left"|Back on earth||1992||-||||||
|-
|align="left"|Best of Vitesse||1997||-|||||| Anthology
|-
|align="left"|Good lookin||1999||-|||||| Antholoty
|}

Singles 

|-
|align="left"|"April wind"||1976||-||||||
|-
|align="left"|"Do you wanna dance"||1976||-||||||
|-
|align="left"|"You can't beat me"||1977||21-05-1977||tip16||-||
|-
|align="left"|"Out in the country"||1978||-||||||
|-
|align="left"|"We'll do the music tonight"||1978||-||||||
|-
|align="left"|"Rock and roll band"||1979||06-10-1979||29||4|| No. 36 in the Single Top 100
|-
|align="left"|"On the run"||1979||15-12-1979||tip18||-||
|-
|align="left"|"Running and hiding"||1979||-||||||
|-
|align="left"|"Goin' up"||1980||-||||||
|-
|align="left"|"Whole lot of travellin"'||1980||23-02-1980||tip17||-||
|-
|align="left"|"Can't keep a promise"||1981||-||||||
|-
|align="left"|"Desire"||1981||-||||||
|-
|align="left"|"Generator of love"||1981||-||||||
|-
|align="left"|"Rosalyn"||1982||21-08-1982||9||7|| No. 16 in the Single Top 100
|-
|align="left"|"Good lookin"'||1982||13-11-1982||4||9|| No. 4 in the Single Top 100
|-
|align="left"|"All my heart"||1983||-||||||
|-
|align="left"|"Julia"||1983||14-05-1983||30||3|| No. 30 in the Single Top 100
|-
|align="left"|"Transit lover"||1983||-||||||
|-
|align="left"|"Highway love"||1984||-||||||
|-
|align="left"|"Keep up"||1984||-||||||
|-
|align="left"|"Vanity islands"||1984||07-07-1984||tip11||-||
|-
|align="left"|"Keepin' me alive"||1985||-||||||
|-
|align="left"|"Lights in the air"||1985||-||||||
|-
|align="left"|"Spanish heat"||1985||-||||||
|-
|align="left"|"You turn me on"||1985||-||||||
|-
|align="left"|"A dirty mind is a joy forever"||1986||-||||||
|-
|align="left"|"I don't lose a friend"||1987||-||||||
|-
|align="left"|"Room to move"||1987||-||||||
|-
|align="left"|"The risin' yen"||1988||-||||||
|-
|align="left"|"Dancin"'||1989||-||||||
|-
|align="left"|"Ever since I met you"||1990||-||||||
|-
|align="left"|"Happy"||1992||-||||||
|-
|align="left"|"What kind of man"||1993||-|||||| No. 88 in the Single Top 100
|-
|align="left"|"Mrs. Everlast"||1993||-||||||
|-
|align="left"|"All of the time"||1994||-||||||
|}

References

Dutch rock music groups
Musical groups established in 1975
Musical groups disestablished in 1994
1975 establishments in the Netherlands
1994 disestablishments in the Netherlands